Asif Mohammad (born 21 December 1965) is a former Pakistani cricketer who played 115 matches of first-class cricket in Pakistan, mostly for Pakistan International Airlines (PIA), from 1979 to 2000. His father was the cricketer Raees Mohammad, and his uncles Wazir, Hanif, Mushtaq and Sadiq all played Test cricket for Pakistan.

Asif toured Zimbabwe with PIA in 1981–82, playing in both first-class matches against Zimbabwe, and scored a century in the second match. When the Sri Lanka Under-23 side toured Pakistan in 1983–84, he played in two of the three matches for Pakistan Under-23 against the tourists. His highest first-class score was 183 for PIA against Agriculture Development Bank in the semi-final of the Patron's Trophy in 1993–94, when he batted for ten and a half hours. He was a member of PIA's title-winning teams in the Quaid-e-Azam Trophy in 1987–88 and 1989–90.

References

External links
 

1965 births
Living people
Pakistani cricketers
Pakistan International Airlines cricketers
Cricketers from Karachi